The won is the currency of both North and South Korea. "Won" is a cognate of the Chinese currency unit, the yuan (//), and the Japanese currency unit, the yen (¥), meaning "round object".  The won is subdivided into 100 jeon.

Yang is a former Korean currency. It is a cognate of the Chinese tael ( pronounced "" in Mandarin). The yang was subdivided into 100 fun (pronounced "pun" but spelt with an "f" on the coins). Fun is a cognate of the Chinese word fen, referring to 1/100 of a Chinese yuan in modern context.

History
Due to interchanging Chinese and Japanese influences, changing Romanization methods, and the use of both hanja (Sino-Korean characters) and hangul scripts, the etymology can be hard to understand. 

From 1892 to 1902, when the yang was used, 1 hwan/won ( = 圓 in Chinese) = 5 yang (兩), while in the Chinese monetary system of that time, 1 yuan = 0.72 tael (兩).

In 1902, the Dai-Ichi Bank (The First National Bank of Japan), which handled the Korean government's custom duties, obtained permission from the imperial Korean government to issue banknotes in yen replacing yang.

The table below summarizes the language used on the modern circulating and historical Korean currencies.

Use in the Western World
The word jeon is also used in Korean to translate the word "cent," and in this context is associated with bul (불, 弗), meaning "dollar." (The hanja character resembles the symbol "$".) These two words are used by Koreans living in the Western hemisphere when referring to dollar currencies.

Sign and computing
The won sign ("₩", a capital W with a horizontal stroke) is represented in Unicode at the code point 20A9 (8361 in decimal).

See also

 Hanja
 Hangul
 Revised Romanization of Korean
 McCune-Reischauer

References

 
Currencies of Korea